Bottomcraig is a village in Fife, Scotland located near Balmerino and The Gauldry.

The village is home to Balmerino Parish Church, built in 1811, and the former manse built in 1816. A school was built in the village in 1776 though in 1830 the parish school relocated to Gauldry where it has remained since.

References

Villages in Fife